Num Bao–Sao Parn  was the special album by Thai rock band Carabao with Parn-Thanaphorn Waekprayoon. It was released in 2006. It was popular album, so have series albums Bao-Parn Return. (บาว-ปาน รีเทิร์น). it released in 2009.

Track listing

References

2006 albums
Carabao (band) albums